Mobile Homes is a 2017 Canadian drama film directed by Vladimir de Fontenay. It was screened in the Directors' Fortnight section at the 2017 Cannes Film Festival.

Cast
 Imogen Poots as Ali
 Callum Turner as Evan
 Callum Keith Rennie as Robert
 Frank Oulton as Bone

Reception
On review aggregator website Rotten Tomatoes, the film holds an approval rating of 58% based on 19 reviews, and an average rating of 6.05/10.

References

External links
 

2017 films
2017 drama films
Canadian drama films
English-language Canadian films
2010s English-language films
2010s Canadian films